The 2014 Philippine Basketball Association (PBA) Commissioner's Cup Finals was the best-of-5 championship series of the 2014 PBA Commissioner's Cup, and the conclusion of the conference's playoffs. The Talk 'N Text Tropang Texters and the San Mig Super Coffee competed for the 14th Commissioner's Cup championship and the 111th overall championship contested by the league.

This championship was also the first PBA finals series that aired in high-definition television for Cignal Digital TV subscribers.

Prior the finals series, Talk 'N Text had a 13-0 record, sweeping both the elimination (nine games) and playoff (four games) rounds. San Mig Super Coffee however won the championship after defeating Talk 'N Text in their finals series, 3-1.

Background

San Mig Super Coffee Mixers
San Mig Super Coffee finished 6th place after the elimination round with a 4-5 record. The team was pitted with the defending champions Alaska in a best-of-three quarterfinal series. Alaska won the first game, 86-77 and was on verge of eliminating San Mig Coffee. The Mixers managed to win the next two games to advance to the semifinal round against Air21 Express, an unexpected semifinalist after they had eliminated the second seeded San Miguel Beermen, who had a twice-to-beat advantage.

Led by the 41-year-old Asi Taulava, they won the first game against the Mixers, 103-100. San Mig Coffee went on to win the next two games to grab the series lead and was one win away in clinching a finals berth. However, the Express went on a three-point shooting spree on Game 4, and forced a rubber match. Game 5 was eventually won by the Mixers, 99-83.

Talk 'N Text Tropang Texters
After missing the semifinal round in the previous conference, Talk 'N Text swept the elimination round, becoming the first team since the 1990 Presto Tivolis to become undefeated in the eliminations, which the Tivolis did in the 1990 PBA All-Filipino Conference. The Tropang Texters gained the top seed and a twice-to-beat advantage against Barangay Ginebra San Miguel. They easily defeated Barangay Ginebra, 97–84, in the quarterfinals and went on to face third seeded Rain or Shine in the semifinals. Talk 'N Text swept Rain or Shine in three games. This achievement gave them a chance to completely sweep the tournament, which was nearly achieved by the 1980 Crispa Redmanizers, who finished 20-1 in the tournament, after they were defeated by the Toyota Super Corollas in Game 3 of the 1980 PBA All-Filipino Conference Finals.

Road to the finals

Head-to-head matchup

Series summary

Game 1

A first half run by the Coffee Mixers helped them gain the lead, and eventually won Game 1, giving Talk 'N Text's first loss in the conference.

Game 2

The Texters came back in Game 2 as they took the lead early on and led for most of the game. Near the end of the game, the Mixers, led by their import, James Mays, managed to close in on the Texters, but solid effort on both ends of the floor in the dying minutes helped Talk 'N Text knot the series up, 1-1.

Game 3

Game 3 was different for both squads, as the game went close up to the last minutes of the game. With Jimmy Alapag struggling, the Tropang Texters, led by Jayson Castro and Ranidel De Ocampo, took the lead 75-71. However, James Mays gave the Mixers a fighting chance after he knocked down a shot while drawing contact, getting the Mixers closer 74-75. With a possible 2-1 lead in the series, Talk 'N Text drew up a play that could run out the clock, however, De Ocampo turned the ball over after Jayson Castro failed to catch his low bounce pass. With a chance to win, the Mixers turned to James Yap, who drilled a long 2-point shot near the corner to give the Mixers the lead 76-75. Jayson Castro got open for a game winning three-point shot but his shot missed, handing the Mixers a 2-1 lead and a chance to close the series.

Game 4

In Game 4, Jimmy Alapag lead Tropang Texters to a 17-1 lead in the early minutes of the game. At the half, they led 52-38 after KG Canaleta drilled a three right before the buzzer sounded. A 16-0 run by the Mixers, led by rookie Ian Sangalang gave the Mixers their first lead of the game 69-68 near the end of the 3rd quarter. Jayson Castro and Ranidel De Ocampo knocked down 2 three-point shots to give the Texters the lead back, 74-69. The Texters regained momentum as they took the lead 80-71, just a few minutes into the 4th quarter. The core group of the Mixers, however, helped them rally once again to take the lead 93-89 and held on to win the game, 100-91. The Commissioner's Cup title gave the Mixers their 3rd consecutive championship and a chance to capture a rare season sweep, also known as a Grand Slam, with Marqus Blakely as their import. James Yap was hailed Finals' MVP.

Rosters

{| class="toccolours" style="font-size: 95%; width: 100%;"
|-
! colspan="2" style="background-color: #; color: #; text-align: center;" | Talk 'N Text Tropang Texters 2014 Commissioner's Cup roster
|- style="background-color:#; color: #; text-align: center;"
! Players !! Coaches
|-
| valign="top" |
{| class="sortable" style="background:transparent; margin:0px; width:100%;"
! Pos. !! # !! POB !! Name !! Height !! Weight !! !! College 
|-
 

{| class="toccolours" style="font-size: 95%; width: 100%;"
|-
! colspan="2" style="background-color: #; color: #; text-align: center;" | San Mig Super Coffee Mixers 2014 Commissioner's Cup roster
|- style="background-color:#; color: #; text-align: center;"
! Players !! Coaches
|-
| valign="top" |
{| class="sortable" style="background:transparent; margin:0px; width:100%;"
! Pos. !! # !! POB !! Name !! Height !! Weight !! !! College 
|-

Broadcast notes

Additional Game 4 crew:
Trophy presentation: James Velasquez
Dugout interviewer: Sel Guevara (only shown on the Cignal HD coverage)

References

External links
PBA official website

2014
2013–14 PBA season
TNT Tropang Giga games
Magnolia Hotshots games
PBA Commissioner's Cup Finals